is a Japanese politician of the New Komeito Party, a member of the House of Representatives in the Diet (national legislature).

Urushibara is a native of Tsubame, Niigata and graduate of Meiji University. He passed the Japanese bar examination during his final year of university, and was admitted to the bar in 1971.

He was elected for the first time in 1996 as a member of the New Frontier Party, which later split into several parties including the New Komeito Party. He was re-elected in 2000, 2003, 2005, 2009, 2012 and 2014.

As of 2017, he serves as chairman of the New Komeito Central Committee, in which capacity he works closely with LDP Secretary-General Toshihiro Nikai to manage the ruling coalition.

References

External links 
  in Japanese.

Members of the House of Representatives (Japan)
20th-century Japanese lawyers
People from Tsubame, Niigata
1944 births
Living people
New Frontier Party (Japan) politicians
20th-century Japanese politicians
New Komeito politicians
21st-century Japanese politicians